Colonel (retired) Yakubu Bako was governor of Akwa Ibom State, Nigeria from December 1993 to August 1996 during the military regime of General Sani Abacha.

Bako graduated from La Follette School of Public Affairs, University of Wisconsin-Madison in 1982.
He served as a major in the United Nations peacekeeping operation in Iran after the Iran–Iraq War, which was in place from 1988 to 1991.
After being appointed Akwa Ibom administrator in December 1993, Bako developed infrastructure in the Bakassi area, later forcibly claimed by Cross River State.

In December 1997 he was jailed for alleged complicity in a coup to overthrow Sani Abacha.
In March 1998 he was among 26 who had been charged during the Gen  Diya led coup plot against Ababcha administration. He was charged and convicted under 'other offences' because his offences of receiving bribe from Alhaji Adamu Dankabo, and the importation of one pistol and 12 rounds of ammunitions in 1983 after his university education in the US, has nothing to do with Diya's coup. Coup plotting was a capital offence.
In March 1999 he was granted clemency and released.
He and others were pardoned by President Olusegun Obasanjo in September 2003 after reviewing his case of non-involvement in any coup plotting.

References

Living people
 Robert M. La Follette School of Public Affairs alumni
Nigerian military governors of Akwa Ibom State
1952 births
Recipients of Nigerian presidential pardons